Maruebo railway station is a railway station located in Maruebo Tok Subdistrict, Ra-ngae District, Narathiwat.

South Thailand insurgency events 
 On 15 November 2009, local No. 463 Phatthalung-Sungai Kolok was gunned by separatists 1 km from Maruebo railway station, causing one police officer to be injured. After inspection, 11 bullet holes were found on the locomotive, and 10 bullet holes on the first carriage (which was the guard's carriage). Later, a bomb was found near the shooting site and soldiers later disarmed it.
 On 27 July 2011, a one-metre track section between Maruebo-Tanyong Mat was destroyed by a separatist bomb, causing disruptions on the Yala-Sungai Kolok section for about 12 hours. No passengers were injured as no trains were running above the section at the time.

Services 
 Rapid No. 171/172 Bangkok-Sungai Kolok-Bangkok
 Rapid No. 175/176 Hat Yai Junction-Sungai Kolok-Hat Yai Junction
 Local No. 447/448 Surat Thani-Sungai Kolok-Surat Thani
 Local No. 451/452 Nakhon Si Thammarat-Sungai Kolok-Nakhon Si Thammarat
 Local No. 453/454 Yala-Sungai Kolok-Yala
 Local No. 463/464 Phatthalung-Sungai Kolok-Phatthalung

References 

 
 

Railway stations in Thailand